George W. Dickinson (January 16, 1843 – October 2, 1928) was an American politician, and diplomat from New York

Life 
Dickinson was born on January 16, 1843, in Aurelius, New York.

Dickinson attended Auburn Academy. He worked as a farmer, teacher, and dealer in leaf tobacco. At some point, he moved to Port Byron and became active in politics there, serving as town supervisor of Mentz for several terms.

In 1889, Dickinson was elected to the New York State Assembly as a Republican, representing the Cayuga County 1st District. He served in the Assembly in 1890 and 1891. In 1898, he was appointed United States Consul at Acapulco, Mexico. He retired as Consul in 1908. Two years later, he moved to Auburn and lived with his daughter for the rest of his life.

Dickinson attended the Port Byron Methodist Church. He was a master of his local Freemason lodge. He had two children, Mrs. Maude I. Jones and C. Elbert.

Dickinson died at home on October 2, 1928. He was buried in Mount Pleasant Cemetery.

References

External links 

 The Political Graveyard

1843 births
1928 deaths
Politicians from Auburn, New York
Farmers from New York (state)
Schoolteachers from New York (state)
Town supervisors in New York (state)
19th-century American politicians
Republican Party members of the New York State Assembly
19th-century American diplomats
20th-century American diplomats
American consuls
Methodists from New York (state)
American Freemasons
Burials in New York (state)